Jean-Pierre Danel (born 4 June 1968) is a French guitarist, record producer, music writer, and songwriter. Jean-Pierre Danel has recorded a large number of guitar albums, as well as guitar teaching materials. In 2006, his album Guitar Connection released by Sony BMG was certified Gold in France, followed by several other records certified gold or platinum.

Biography

1980s to 1990s
Born in La Varenne, Maine-et-Loire, France, Danel, the son of the French pop singer Pascal Danel and the nephew of opera director Jean-Pierre Ponnelle, started his career as a professional guitarist in July 1982, at the age of 14.  After many tours and studio recordings with French session musicians, he released various guitar albums.

Stratospheric (2000)
In 2001, he was invited to play on the album Les Masters de la Guitare, to which Eric Clapton, BB King, Carlos Santana or Al Di Meola also contributed.

Guitar Connection (2006)
Danel's album Guitar Connection was released by Sony/BMG in July 2006 and reached the #1 spot in the charts in France, followed by several other records certified gold or platinum (https://www.upfi.fr/les-certifications/)  It was certified Gold and soon became a series of hit albums, with Guitar Connection 2 released in March 2007. It contains a duet with British guitar legend Hank Marvin. Danel also records many duets with French stars Laurent Voulzy, Louis Bertignac, Axel Bauer, Michael Jones or Paul Personne, among others.    In June 2007, Danel received the Grand Prix Français de la Guitare award.

Out of the Blues (2010)
In November 2010, Danel's Out of the Blues guitar album was released by Universal, with sales going towards AIDS research. Danel recorded duets with a number of guitarists such as Hank Marvin again, Albert Lee (recorded at the Abbey Road Studios), Scott Henderson, Andy Powell of Wishbone Ash, Jake Shimabukuro and various popular French artists. The album was supported by Carla Bruni, then First Lady of France, and Brian May of Queen, who also wrote a note in the booklet. The pair was reunited in a charity organized by Danel in 2013: The album is certified Gold and the DVD gets a Platinum disc

The Hit List (2013)
Danel's digital compilation album The Hit List debuted on the French compilation albums chart at number 18.

Guitar Tribute (2016)
On 25 March 2016, Danel released Guitar Tribute (Sony Music), a box set containing 2 CDs (a compilation and a live album) and the DVD of a private live show, All You Need Is Live, given for his daughter. Half of the concert consisted of Danel's hits, with two new songs, while the other half is a collection of covers of classics that influenced the guitar player (The Beatles, The Shadows, Elvis Presley, etc.). Half of the tunes are vocal. Several duets are included, as well as video tributes to Danel by Brian May of Queen, Hank Marvin of The Shadows, several French artists and Sony Music and Warner Music CEOs Danel embarked on a promotional tour, with a primetime TV show, several other TV appearances and TV advertising. The album entered the compilation albums chart at number 7. The DVD All You Need is Live is certified double Platinum.
In 2017, after Génération Guitare, a double album with guitarist Jean-Félix Lalanne, Sony Music released an anthology, a 10 CDs box set called Guitar Player, that includes 214 of Danel's, recordings, picked from his various albums.
In 2019, a rose is named after him. In 2020, a long documentary was announced and a biography was published and "Côté Jazz" hits the #1 spot on the Jazz Album Charts in France.

Guitar Story (2020) & Guitar Safari (2022)
In 2021, his DVD Guitar Story TV Special gets a Gold Disc certification.
His album and DVD Hats off to the boys is then released in several countries, and gets a Gold disc in France by the end of the year. His DVD Guitar Video Connection, celebrating 40 years of career in 2022, follows by Christmas and is certified Gold within a few days.
A triple album, Guitar Safari, is released at the same time, also celebrating 40 years of recording with a new album, a Best Of and a live album. Guitar Safari is certified Gold  in France. 
An important number of Danel records have hit the charts in France as well as internationally, including in the US.

Puzzle Productions
As a record producer, Danel started his own company, Puzzle Productions, in 1989. He produced dozens of hit records and also bought the rights for many songs from other companies, creating an 18,000-song catalogue. In several TV documentaries, record industry specialists called Danel one of the biggest independent producers in France.
His work also includes the production, with DJ Da French Guy, of radio remixes for artists such as Madonna, Britney Spears, Daft Punk, and Moby.
In 2014, he receives at Sony Music headquarters a multi-diamond disc for 25 years as a record producer, and, at the time, 23,3 million records sold and 191 gold and platinum disc received as a producer.

Writer
Danel is also the author of several books, the best known of which are biographies of French playwright and actor Sacha Guitry. His second book about Guitry is featured on the book list for French students at Berkeley University, CA. In 2023, he publishes a biography of French theater star Sarah Bernhardt.Danel also published in 2012 a book about the Fender Stratocaster (foreword by Hank Marvin). In 2014, he released the video "The Fender Stratocaster Story", based on the book and on his vast collection of guitars, in which can be found "Miss Daisy", a scarce 1954 pre-production Stratocaster, worth US$250,000.

Charities
Danel produced records to the benefit of various charities (AIDS, Amnesty International, etc.). Also a vegetarian and animal lover, Danel launched "Guitar Players for Animal Rights" to the benefit of PETA, and was joined by fellow guitarists Brian May (of Queen), Steve Lukather (of Toto), Hank Marvin (of The Shadows) as well as French stars such as singer and composer/producer for Celine Dion, Jean-Jacques Goldman or French movie star Jean-Paul Belmondo.

Discography – Albums (LPs, CDs)
 Chorus (1993)
 Remember Shadows (1994)
 Guitar Generation (1995)
 Le Meilleur Des Shadows (1995)
 Guitar Line (1997)
 Plays 18 Hits Of The Shadows (1997)
 Tribute To The Shadows 40 Years (2 CD, 40 tracks, 1998)
 Les Années Shadows (2 CD, 46 titres, 1998)
 The Best Of The Guitar Legends (Vol. 1 to 3, 75 tracks, 1998)
 A Tribute To The Shadows – The Gold Series (1998)
 Guitar Greatest (2 CD, 2000)
 La Légende Des Shadows (2000)
 The Guitar Album (2000)
 Stratospheric (2000)
 Plays Hits of the Shadows (2000)
 The Playback Collection (Vol. 1 to 4, 2001)
 Guitarmania (4 CD, 88 tracks, 2001)
 Nuits Parisiennes (2001)
 A Tribute To The Shadows (vol. 1 to 4, 80 tracks, 2000-2001)
 Guitar Classics (2002)
 Guitar Gold Themes (2002)
 The Shadows' Anthology – The Tribute Album By Jean-Pierre Danel (2002)
 Essential Guitar (2002)
 All The Best (2 CD, 2002)
 Guitare (5 CD, 100 Titres, 2003)
 Guitar Greatest Hits (2005)
 Guitar Connection (2006)
 Guitar Connection 2 (2007)
 Guitar Connection 3 (2008)
 The Best of Guitar Connection (2009)
 Guitar Connection Anthology  (2009)
 Out of the blues (Duet album) (CD + DVD) (2010)
 When the guitar rocks (2011)
 Guitar Guitar Guitar (2011)
 Guitar Anthology (100 titres) (2011)
 The Blues Album (2012)
 Guitar Greatest Hits (2012)
 The Greatest Guitar Hits (2012)
 The Best of Guitar (2012)
 The Best of Jean-Pierre DANEL (2012)
 The Hit List (2013)
 Guitar Greatest Hits  (2014) (3 CDs metal box)
 Guitar Tribute (2016) (Box set, 2 cds + dvd)
 All You Need is Live (2016)  (dvd)
 Génération Guitare  (with Jean-Félix Lalanne)  (Double album) (2017) 
 Guitar Player  (10 CDs Anthology box set, 214 tracks) (2017)
 Guitar Story TV Special (dvd) (2020)
  Côté Jazz (2020)
  Les Notes Bleues (2020)
  All the Jazz (2021) (compilation)
  Guitar Safari (2021)

Participation
 Les Masters De La Guitare – Les Plus Grands Guitaristes (1 track among other guitar players) (2001)

Books
 Femme, mode d'emploi : la femme vue par les hommes : 3000 citations par plus de 500 auteurs (édité par Jean-Pierre Danel), éditions NM7, Paris, 2000,   
 Le destin fabuleux de Sacha Guitry, éditions Marque-Pages, coll. « Beaux livres », 2007,  
 Chroniques d'une vie passionnante : enfin, je crois : journal pour de vrai d'un futur papa dans les ennuis, Courcelles publishing, Paris, 2008, 
 Petites explications sur les femmes à l'attention des hommes perdus et désespérés : près de  citations sur les femmes par plus de 800 auteurs (réunies par Jean-Pierre Danel), Courcelles publishing, Paris, 2008,   
 365 moyens de se faire pardonner, enfin, de tenter d'essayer : petit guide à l'attention des hommes qui ont gaffé, et s'ils l'ont pas fait exprès, eh ben c'est grave quand même !, Courcelles publishing, Paris, 2010,   
 365 moyens d'adopter le life style des people : et de devenir hyper-intéressant chez son coiffeur, Courcelles publishing, Paris, 2010,   
 365 moyens de rendre son homme heureux : tout ce qu'il faut dire, faire et savoir pour que votre homme ronronne de bonheur ! : petit guide à l'attention des femmes optimistes et motivées, Courcelles publishing, Paris, 2010,   
 Elvis Presley : La légende du king, Courcelles Publishing, Paris, janvier 2010 
 Légende de la Fender Stratocaster , Auteurs du Monde, préface de Hank Marvin, septembre 2012 
 Elvis Presley intime : L'icône perdue (avec un CD audio), Editions Contre-dires, Décembre 2013 
 Cordes Sensibles – Un guitariste au pays du show business Auteurs du Monde, préface de Gilbert Mitterrand 
 Miss Daisy : Le graal de la Fender Stratocaster Auteurs du Monde 
 Sarah Bernhardt : La Belle Etoile Auteurs du Monde

References

External links 

 
 Jean-Pierre Danel portrait, Rolling Stone
 Jean-Pierre Danel portrait, Guitar Part
 
 
 
 
 	

1968 births
Living people
French blues guitarists
French male guitarists
Blues rock musicians
French rock guitarists
People from Saint-Maur-des-Fossés